The Dzhardzhan Range (Carcaan) is a range of mountains in far North-eastern Russia. Administratively the range is part of the Sakha Republic, Russian Federation.

Geography 
The Dzhardzhan Range is one of the subranges of the Verkhoyansk Range system and is located in its northern section. It stretches from north to south between the Lena River to the west and the higher Orulgan Range to the east, running in a roughly parallel direction to it. River Dzhardzhan cuts across the range in its middle section.

Hydrography
Rivers with their sources in the more massive Orulgan rising to the east cut across the Dzhardzhan Range through steep gorges and ravines. They are right tributaries of the Lena River flowing westwards, such as the Natara, Uel-Siktyakh and Kuranakh-Siktyakh. The Byosyuke flows in its northern limit while the valleys of the Syncha and Nelon, the two rivers which form the Menkere, are at its southern end.

Flora
The mountain slopes are covered with larch taiga and the valleys with tundra.

See also
List of mountains and hills of Russia

References

External links
Ancient Middle-Carboniferous Flora of the Orulgan Range (Northern Verkhoyansk) and justification of Age Bylykat Formation
Verkhoyansk Range

pl:Dżardżanskij chriebiet
sah:Дьардьаан (сис)